Cinnamodendron dinisii is a species of flowering plant in the family Canellaceae. It is found in Southern Brazil.

References 
	

dinisii